Juan Carlos Rodríguez Moreno (born 19 January 1965), known as Juan Carlos, is a Spanish retired professional footballer who played as a left back.

Club career
Juan Carlos was born in Puente Castro, León. During his career, he represented Real Valladolid (two spells, to kickstart and end his 15-year spell as a professional), Atlético Madrid, FC Barcelona and Valencia CF. With Barça, he started and finished their win against U.C. Sampdoria in the final of the 1991–92 European Cup, and was relatively used in three consecutive La Liga titles by the Catalans. He played 297 league games as a professional, all in the top division, scoring two goals – both for Valladolid.

In 2008, Juan Carlos returned to Valladolid, working with the club in directorial capacities.

International career
Juan Carlos earned one cap for the Spain national team, on 17 April 1991. He played the entire match in a 0–2 friendly loss with Romania in Cáceres.

Honours
Atlético Madrid
Copa del Rey: 1990–91

Barcelona
La Liga: 1991–92, 1992–93, 1993–94
Supercopa de España: 1991, 1992
European Cup: 1991–92; Runner-up 1993–94

Valencia
Copa del Rey runner-up: 1994–95

Spain U21
UEFA European Under-21 Championship: 1986

References

External links

1965 births
Living people
Sportspeople from León, Spain
Spanish footballers
Footballers from Castile and León
Association football defenders
La Liga players
Real Valladolid players
Atlético Madrid footballers
FC Barcelona players
Valencia CF players
Spain under-21 international footballers
Spain international footballers
Spanish football managers
Real Valladolid non-playing staff